National Public School is a coeducational CBSE on Nainital Road in Bareilly, Uttar Pradesh. It is run by the National Public School Society trust.

History
The school was founded in 1986 when some of the society well-wishers, realizing the educational backwardness of the area, came together irrespective of the differences in religion and caste prevalent at the time, and created a trust, the National Public School Society, to establish the town's first English medium school. The school made world-class knowledge available to the Baheri region, and with the continuous efforts of the staff and active involvement of trust members, in it soon started producing students who excelled in many fields.

National Public School also has a junior branch in Teacher's Colony, near the Kesar Sugar factory in Baheri.

The school celebrated its silver jubilee in 2010.

It operates more than 15 buses, transporting students in about a 30-kilometer area.

Activities
The school balances its studies with other activities. It organises an annual sports meet with interschool competition. It hosts other intraschool activities including handwriting, drawing, mehendi, debate, and quiz. Students are divided into four colour houses: red, blue, green and yellow. They wear shirts of these colours mainly on Saturday for cocurricular activities. For the Student Cabinet, the Head Boy, Head Girl, and students for various other posts are annually elected by the school staff.

Facilities
National Public School believes in students' well rounded development by balancing academics, extracurricular activities and sports in a state-of-the-art infrastructure within the campus. Its facilities include:

 Library
 Computer lab
 Science lab
 Playground
 Bus network

Students
National Public School students have gone on to some of the country's most prestigious universities, including Delhi University, Aligarh Muslim University, and Jamia Millia Islamia. It has alumni around the globe, including the UK, United States, Australia and Saudi Arabia.

External links

Primary schools in Uttar Pradesh
High schools and secondary schools in Uttar Pradesh
Bareilly district
Educational institutions established in 1986
1986 establishments in Uttar Pradesh